Right Here, Right Now or Right Here Right Now may refer to:

Films
Right Here, Right Now (film), a 2003 short film by Anand Gandhi
Right Here Right Now (2004 film), by Matthew Newton

Books
Right Here, Right Now (book), a 2018 nonfiction book by Stephen Harper
Right Here, Right Now, a 1999 novel by Trey Ellis

Music

Albums and videos
Right Here, Right Now (David Benoit album) or the title song, 2003
 Right Here Right Now (Jordin Sparks album) or the title song, 2015
Right Here, Right Now (video), by Atomic Kitten, 2002
 Right Here Right Now Tour, a concert tour by Van Halen, 1993
Live: Right Here, Right Now, an album by Van Halen, 1993
Right Here, Right Now, an album by Russ Taff, 1999

Songs
 "Right Here Right Now" (BWO song), 2009
 "Right Here, Right Now" (Charlie Major song), 1999
 "Right Here, Right Now" (Fatboy Slim song), 1998
 "Right Here, Right Now" (Giorgio Moroder song), featuring Kylie Minogue, 2015
 "Right Here, Right Now" (High School Musical song), 2008
 "Right Here, Right Now" (Jesus Jones song), 1990
 "Right Here, Right Now (My Heart Belongs to You)", by Agnes Carlsson, 2005; covered by Raffaëla Paton, 2006
 "Right Here Right Now", by Abhishek Bachchan and Sunidhi Chauhan from the soundtrack of the film Bluffmaster!, 2005
 "Right Here Right Now", by KISS from Monster, 2012
 "Right Here, Right Now", by Kylie Minogue from Let's Get to It, 1991
 "Right Here, Right Now", by San Holo

See also
 Right Here and Now, a 2002 album by Owen Temple
 Right Here and Now (Marcia Hines album), 1994
 "Right Now, Right Here", a song by Bret Michaels from Freedom of Sound, 2005
 Right Here (disambiguation)
 Right Now (disambiguation)
 Here and Now (disambiguation)